Meihekou is a city of 600,000 in Jilin province, People's Republic of China. It is a regional transport hub, connecting three railway lines, all of which are single track, and 2 national highways. The city is also a major lorry transshipment point in the region as it is also the junction of two trunk roads, connected to Liaoyuan in the northwest. The city is administratively a county-level city of the prefecture-level city of Tonghua, and is its northernmost county-level division.

Geography
It is situated in the western foothills of the Changbai Mountains and on the upper reaches of the Huifa River. Bordering county-level divisions are Huinan County to the east, Liuhe County to the south and southeast, Qingyuan Manchu Autonomous County (Liaoning) to the southwest, Dongfeng County to the west and northwest.

Climate

Administrative divisions

Subdistricts:
Xinhua Subdistrict, Jiefang Subdistrict, Guangming Subdistrict, Heping Subdistrict, Fumin Subdistrict

Towns:
Shancheng, Hailong, Hongmei, Jinhua, Xinhe, Shuguang, Zhonghe, Meihekou, Yizuoying, Shuidao, Yezhuhe, Kangdaying, Heishantou, Niuxinding, Dawan

Townships:
Lilu Township, Shuangquan Township, Sibashi Township, Chengnan Township, Yimin Township, Xingling Township, Jile Township, Shuangxing Township, Xinghua Township, Jiangjiajie Township, Wanlong Township, Xiaoyang Manchu and Korean Ethnic Township, Huayuan Korean Ethnic Township

Transportation
Meihekou is a regional transport hub, connecting the Shenji (Shenyang−Jilin City), the Simei (Siping−Meihekou), and the Meiji (Meihekou−Ji'an ) Railways. The highways that pass through the area are the Heida (Heihe−Dalian) Highway and the Jixi (Ji'an−Xilinhot) Highway.

References

External links
Meihekou government website (Chinese)

Cities in Jilin